= Sergei Eisenstein bibliography =

A list of books and essays by or about Sergei Eisenstein.

- Eisenstein, Sergei (1947). The Film Sense. Harcourt, Brace. ISBN 978-0-15-630935-6.
- Eisenstein, Sergei (1974). Eisenstein: three films. Harper & Row. ISBN 978-0-06-430055-1.
- Eisenstein, Sergei (1 January 1995). Beyond the Stars: The Memoirs of Sergei Eisenstein. Seagull Books. ISBN 978-81-7046-057-2.
- Eisenstein, Sergei (1977). Film form: essays in film theory. Harcourt, Brace. ISBN 978-0-15-630920-2.
- Eisenstein, Sergei; Taylor, Richard; Institute, British Film (December 1998). The Eisenstein reader. British Film Institute. ISBN 978-0-85170-675-7.
- Goodwin, James (1 January 1993). Eisenstein, Cinema, and History. University of Illinois Press. p. 235. ISBN 978-0-252-06269-8.
- LaValley, Albert J.; Scherr, Barry P. (2001). Eisenstein at 100: A Reconsideration. Rutgers University Press. ISBN 978-0-8135-2971-4.
- Moussinac, Léon (1970). Sergei Eisenstein. Crown Publishers.
- Nesbet, Anne (15 June 2007). Savage Junctures: Sergei Eisenstein and the Shape of Thinking. I. B. Tauris. ISBN 978-1-84511-418-3.
- O'Mahony, Mike (22 July 2008). Sergei Eisenstein. Reaktion Books. ISBN 978-1-86189-449-6.
- Passfield, John (21 September 2011). Death Day: The Apology of Sergei Eisenstein. AuthorHouse. ISBN 978-1-4634-3058-0.
- Salazkina, Masha (1 August 2009). In Excess: Sergei Eisenstein's Mexico. University of Chicago Press. ISBN 978-0-226-73416-3.
